Change of Sex or Sex Change is a 1976 Spanish film, written and directed by Vicente Aranda. It stars Victoria Abril as José Maria. The film dramatizes the story of a young feminine boy, who moves to the city to explore his desire to become a woman.

Synopsis 
In a small town outside of Barcelona, José Maria is a teenager who starts to identify as a woman. While he begins to show his desire to be a woman through his appearance, the reactions within his household make things more difficult for him. His rude father is a male chauvinist who, afraid of his son's softness, puts him to work chopping wood. Then, his father takes him to a cabaret show, to expose José Maria to women. However at a show, José Maria is exposed to a dancer named Bibi, who is a transgender woman, for the first time. After the show, his father tries to force José Maria to have sex with a prostitute, but he refuses. José Maria flees from there feeling guilty. He escapes to the city where he tries to be accepted as a woman with tragic results. While working as a hairdresser, he meets Bibi, the trans woman who works at the cabaret and José Maria goes to work with her. In the show, he is not José Maria anymore, but Maria José. At the cabaret, he falls in love with Durán, the owner of the bar. Durán, reluctant at the beginning, nevertheless starts a relationship with Maria José, who wants to go all the way, and plans to travel to London to have a gender reassignment operation.

Cast
 Victoria Abril as José María/María José
 Lou Castel as Durán
 Fernando Sancho as José Maria's father
 Rafaela Aparicio as Pilar
 Daniel Martín as Pedro
 Montserrat Carulla as José Maria's mother
 Bibi Andersen as Bibí
 Mario Gas as Álvaro
 Maria Elías as Lolita

References

External links

1976 films
1970s Spanish-language films
1976 drama films
1976 LGBT-related films
Spanish LGBT-related films
Films directed by Vicente Aranda
Transgender-related films
LGBT-related drama films
Spanish drama films
1977 drama films
1977 films
1970s Spanish films